Omar Khayyam High School  is one of the oldest high schools in Iran, registered by the Cultural Heritage Organization of Iran. The school was opened on September 22, 1940.

Gallery

Sources 
 Farsi Wikipedia

Buildings and structures in Nishapur
High schools in Iran
Education in Razavi Khorasan Province
Buildings and structures in Razavi Khorasan Province